The fulvous-chested jungle flycatcher (Cyornis olivaceus) is a species of bird in the Old World flycatcher family Muscicapidae.
It is found in Brunei, Indonesia, Malaysia, Myanmar, and Thailand.
Its natural habitat is subtropical or tropical moist lowland forests.

This species was previously placed in the genus Rhinomyias but was moved to Cyornis based on the results of a 2010 molecular phylogenetic study.

References

External links
Image at ADW 

fulvous-chested jungle flycatcher
Birds of Malesia
fulvous-chested jungle flycatcher
Taxonomy articles created by Polbot